David Evans (18 June 1893 – 14 March 1959) was a British sculptor. His work was part of the art competitions at the 1932 Summer Olympics and the 1948 Summer Olympics.

Amongst his works are the frieze over the doorway at 25 Marylebone Road - the Headquarters of the Methodist Church.

References

External links
 

1893 births
1959 deaths
20th-century British sculptors
English male sculptors
Olympic competitors in art competitions
People from Chorlton-cum-Hardy
20th-century English male artists